John Holland (June 11, 1899 – September 2, 1971) was an American actor who started his career as the male lead in two 1927 silents, Rich But Honest and The Secret Studio, but the advent of sound brought him a mix of occasional male leads, second leads and parts further down the cast list.

Biography
John Holland was born James B. Holland in Kenosha, Wisconsin. He began acting in Hollywood films in 1926, billed as Clifford Holland in his earliest appearances. He later ascribed this to a casting director confusing him with his cousin, civil engineer Clifford Milburn Holland. He was best known for roles in the Pre-Code dramas Hell Harbor and She Goes to War. Holland was 33 years old at the time of his final film performance in a 10th-billed supporting role in 1932's The Silver Lining. He died in Laguna Beach, California in 1971 at the age of 72.

Filmography
 Summer Bachelors (1926)
 Rich But Honest (1927)
 The Secret Studio (1927)
 She Goes to War (1929)
 Black Magic (1929)
 The College Coquette (1929)
 Guilty? (1930)
 Hell Harbor (1930)
 Ladies Must Play (1930)
 The Eyes of the World (1930)
 Ladies' Man (1931)
 Defenders of the Law (1931)
 The Lady from Nowhere (1931)
 Grief Street (1931)
 Morals for Women (1931)
 The Silver Lining (1932)

References

External links

 

1899 births
1971 deaths
American male silent film actors
20th-century American male actors
Male actors from Wisconsin
Actors from Kenosha, Wisconsin